The Brazilian Air Force has a large number of active and planned projects, under the modernization plans of the Brazilian Armed Forces, defined in the National Defense White Paper (Portuguese: Livro Branco da Defesa Nacional - LBDN). From 2010, Brazil started a radical change in its military policy, aiming to consolidate itself as the major power of Latin America.

The prospective scenario analysis developed in 2005 by the U.S. Pentagon for the year 2035, foresees a permanent growth of Brazil's influence in international relations. The intensification of projection in the concert of nations and its greater insertion in the global decisions, conduct the Armed Forces to a new structure compatible with the country's new political-strategic status. In 2020, was approved by the MoD the increase of the defense budget from 1.4% to 2% of the GDP.

Active projects

Fighters

Since mid-2000s, the Air Force and the Brazilian companies of the aerospace defense conglomerate like Embraer, are in development of the E/F versions of the JAS 39 Gripen multirole fighter with Saab and Sweden. This program is part of a deal between the Brazilian Ministry of Defense and Sweden in 2015, for the acquisition of 36 jets from Saab. Brazil will receive this jets along 2020s, other 72 units are planned in two more batches.

The force is also in undergoing modernization of the AMX attack jets, include a new Mectron SCP-01 Scipio radar, Embraer BR2 data link, FLIR Systems, new navigation equipments, the Elbit INS/GPS/databus, a glass cockpit, and a new OBOGS system and HMD DASH IV. Along the 2000s Brazil continue to receive several units of the Super Tucano light attack aircraft of the A & B variants.

Aerial refueling and transport aircraft

The Air Force have three major programs to modernize its aerial refueling and transport fleet. Since mid-2010s, the force is incorporating new units of the Embraer KC-390, finish by 2030. The country is also under negotiation for units of the A330 MRTT, in order to solve operational gaps, and to a more consistent form of regional and global power projection along with the new JAS-39 Gripens in incorporation. Since 2010s, the Air Force is receiving several units of the CASA C-295, for regional transport and SAR roles.

Helicopters
Since 2008, the Air Force receive annually several units from different types of helicopters, from Helibras factory in Itajubá, Minas Gerais. The units are the Eurocopter EC 725 Caracal, EC135 Cougar, and the AS332 Super Puma. Since the 2010s, was incorporated several units of the Sikorsky UH-60.

Armaments
The Brazilian Army is developing and incorporate along with Avibras, the cruise missile AV-TM 300. This missile can be used along with the ASTROS system, with an operational range from 30 km to 1,000 km carrying a warhead from to 500 kg. A variant for the Air Force called MICLA-BR is under tests from 2019. The country also have several deals for missiles and bombs for the new JAS-39 Gripen, such as the Meteor BVR missile, the IRIS-T missile, A-Darter, and the Spice 250 and Spice 1000 guided-bombs.

SGDC
The Geostationary Defense and Strategic Communications Satellites or SGDC, are geostationary communication satellites developed by the Brazilian Air Force and the Brazilian Space Agency, created with the objective of operating strategic military, government and civil communications, also offering broadband internet throughout the national territory. The first satellite called SGDC-1, was launched in 2017 and the SGDC-2 has planned to launch in 2022. The Space Operations Center (COPE) was inaugurated in 2020, subordinated to the Aerospace Operations Command, with the objective of operating the satellites.

Link-BR2

The Link-BR2 is a datalink developed by the Air Force and the Brazilian defence company AEL Sistemas, this technology allow the exchange of data such radar information, videos and images with other units of the three branches anytime and anywere, using an advanced encrypted protocol with a high degree of security.

Planned projects

Loyal wingman
In April 2021, was launched a development program with the Air Force and Embraer, for a national loyal wingman (UAV) for operation in the end 2020s.

Hybrid turboprop light transport
In November 2020, was launched a development program called STOUT with the Air Force and Embraer, for a new hybrid turboprop light transport, for operation in the end 2020s, in order to replace C-95 Bandeirante and C-97 Brasília.

Medium-range air defense system
The Ministry of Defence  will start in the 2020s, the acquisition of a medium-range air defense system. In December 2020, the MoD approved the prerequisites of the future system, will be operated by the three branches of the Brazilian Armed Forces, in order to reduce operational costs, in addition to facilitating the integration between all systems already in operation in the forces. The battery will have to comply with the following operational requirements: must be able to effectively engage aerospace threats simultaneously in a minimum horizontal engagement range not exceeding 2,000 meters; maximum horizontal engagement range not less than 40,000 meters; minimum vertical engagement range not exceeding 50 meters; and maximum vertical engagement range not less than 15,000 meters. The system will be capable to engage fixed-wing aircraft, helicopters, UAVs, cruise missiles and guided bombs.

See also

Future of the Brazilian Army
Future of the Brazilian Navy

References

Brazilian Air Force
Military planning